The Blue Collar Worker and the Hairdresser in a Whirl of Sex and Politics (also known as The Worker and the Hairdresser) is a 1996 Italian comedy film directed by Lina Wertmüller.

Plot 
The ideals of Tunin, a communist metalworker, are challenged when he falls in love with Rossella, a supporter of the right-wing Northern League.

Cast 
Tullio Solenghi: Tunin Gavazzi
Gene Gnocchi: Zvanin
Veronica Pivetti: Rossella Giacometti
Piera Degli Esposti: Palmina Gavazzi
Cinzia Leone: Mariolina
Cyrielle Claire: Anitina
Rossy de Palma

References

External links

1996 films
1996 comedy films
Italian comedy films
Films directed by Lina Wertmüller
1990s Italian-language films
1990s Italian films